Night Slave (ナイト・スレイブ) is an eroge run and gun video game  released in 1996 for the NEC PC-98 computer. The game's design and gameplay draws inspiration from the Assault Suits series, particularly Assault Suits Valken (1992), as well as the Gradius series.  It employs many action role-playing game elements such as permanently levelling up the mecha and various weapons using power-orbs obtained from defeating enemies as well as storyline cut scenes, which occasionally contain lesbian adult content. The game's armaments system also employs recoil physics, while the gameplay is varied, including environments such as rainy jungles, snowy wastes, and alien bases.

References

External links
 
1996 video games
NEC PC-9801 games
NEC PC-9801-only games
Run and gun games
Video games featuring female protagonists
Eroge
LGBT-related video games
Japan-exclusive video games
Video games developed in Japan